God Bless Tiny Tim is the first album by Tiny Tim. Released in 1968 on the Reprise label, it included "Tiptoe Through The Tulips" (the song which made him famous), a version of "I Got You Babe", and a collection of obscure songs.  Many of the songs have humorous lyrics, are sung for humorous effect, or have an unexpected hook. It is widely praised, but was not released on CD until 1998, and even then, only in Japan. It later was re-released on CD in 2013 with a number of bonus tracks that include alternate and instrumental versions of the album's songs as well as non-album singles.

The album was produced by Richard Perry, who had produced Captain Beefheart's first album Safe as Milk and later produced albums by Barbra Streisand, Harry Nilsson, Rod Stewart, Carly Simon and Ringo Starr. The arrangements are by Artie Butler.

The songs were written by a variety of composers, most from the early 20th century, and most rather obscure; however, "I Got You Babe" was by Sonny Bono, and "Stay Down Here Where You Belong" was by Irving Berlin.

For some of the album, Tim sings in his unusual falsetto style. However, on a number of songs ("Stay Down Here Where You Belong", "The Coming Home Party" and others) he sings in a rich baritone, demonstrating his voice's range. In "On the Old Front Porch", "Daddy, Daddy, What Is Heaven Like?" and on "I Got You Babe", he sings both baritone and falsetto, alternating between the two. A joke in "I Got You Babe" is revealed in the last words where both baritone and falsetto voices unexpectedly sing at once, revealing the apparently agile duet is actually himself singing double-tracked.

Track listing

Side one
"Welcome to My Dream" (Jimmy Van Heusen, Johnny Burke) – 1:27
"Tiptoe Thru' the Tulips with Me" (Al Dubin, Joe Burke) – 1:51
"Livin' in the Sunlight, Lovin' in the Moonlight" (Al Lewis, Al Sherman) – 2:06
"On the Old Front Porch" (Bobby Heath, Arthur Lange) – 3:40
"The Viper" (Norman Blagman) – 2:23
"Stay Down Here Where You Belong" (Irving Berlin) – 2:40
"Then I'd Be Satisfied with Life" (George M. Cohan) – 2:52
"Strawberry Tea" (Gordon Alexander) – 3:23

Side two
"The Other Side" (Bill Dorsey) – 4:32
"Ever Since You Told Me That You Love Me (I'm a Nut)" (Edgar Leslie, Grant Clarke, Jean Schwartz) – 2:42
"Daddy, Daddy, What Is Heaven Like?" (Art Wayne) – 2:23
"The Coming Home Party" (Diane Hildebrand, Jack Keller) – 3:01
"Fill Your Heart" (Biff Rose, Paul Williams) – 3:09
"I Got You, Babe" (Sonny Bono) – 2:13
"This Is All I Ask" (Gordon Jenkins) – 3:20

References

1968 debut albums
Tiny Tim (musician) albums
Albums produced by Richard Perry
Reprise Records albums